The Order of Queen Tamara was a Georgian military decoration granted to members of the Georgian Legion and of the German Caucasus Expedition who fought in Georgia after 4 November 1918. 

The official criterion, proclaimed by General Zakhari Mdivani, the Georgian minister of war, stated: "For merits in Georgia herewith all officers and enlisted men of the German troops in the Caucasus, which remained in Georgia after November 4, 1918, have the right to wear the Order of Saint Tamara." 

After the implementation of the Democratic Republic of Georgia, the order was confirmed by Decree No. 5352 on December 13, 1918.

Notes

Sources

See also 

 Orders, decorations, and medals of Georgia
 Order of Queen Tamara (2009)

External links
The Georgian Order of St Tamara Medal at The German Caucasian Expedition: Georgia 1918
Guide to German Ribbon Bars, 1914–1945: "probably the single most peculiar military decoration of all time"
The World's Most Bizarre Award—A New Chapter! at the Gentleman's Military Interest Club (GMIC)
Georgia: The Order of Tamara at the Orders and Medals Society of America (OMSA)
Royal Order of Queen Tamar

Democratic Republic of Georgia
Orders, decorations, and medals of Georgia (country)